The Yverdon to Sainte-Croix Railway (YSteC) is a  railway line and former railway company in Switzerland. It is now owned and operated by the TRAVYS company (Transports Vallée-de-Joux - Yverdon-les-Bains - Sainte-Croix).

History 

The line was opened in 1893 by the Yverdon–Ste-Croix railway company, largely as a result of the influence of William Barbey from Valeyres-sous-Rances, who financed the building of the line. The line initially used steam locomotives to the articulated Mallet design. Because of the influence of the religious William Barbey, the line did not operate any trains on Sundays.

In 1918, after the death of William Barbey, the line began operations on Sundays.

In 1974 the railway pioneered the Vevey system of Rollbocks, which allows a train of standard-gauge wagons to be automatically loaded onto transporter bogies so that it can travel on a narrow-gauge line.

Seven people died and 40 others were injured. The accident was put down to human error; the two trains were scheduled to cross at Essert-sous-Champvent, but the line was not equipped with automatic block signalling that would have prevented the accident.

In 2001, the Yverdon–Ste-Croix railway company was merged with the Pont-Brassus railway company and the Transports Publics Yverdon-Grandson bus company to form the new TRAVYS company. The company has since also absorbed the Orbe–Chavornay railway company.

In 2013 and as part of a joint order with Transports de la région Morges-Bière-Cossonay, the Montreux–Oberland Bernois railway and Transports publics fribourgeois, TRAVYS ordered three new trains for the Yverdon–Ste-Croix railway from Stadler Rail. Of these, two will be used to replace older stock, whilst the third will allow the introduction of a half-hourly service on the line. The trains are due for delivery in 2015.

Locomotives and rolling stock

References

External links 

 Web site of TRAVYS, owners of the line (in French)

Metre gauge railways in Switzerland
Defunct railway companies of Switzerland
Railway lines in Switzerland
Railway lines opened in 1893